Ante Pandaković (1890–1968) was a Croatian football coach, most notably managing the national team of the Kingdom of Yugoslavia from 1926 to 1930.

Montevideo
In the 2012 Serbian sports series Montevideo, God Bless You! (based on the 2010 film), Pandaković is portrayed (in one episode) by Miroslav Ćiro Blažević. The film is about the Yugoslav national football team at the 1930 World Cup, when the players from Croatian clubs refused to join the squad after the FA's headquarters were moved from Zagreb to Belgrade, prompting Croatia-born Pandaković to step down as manager.

Notes

References

External links
 Reprezentacija.rs profile

1890 births
1968 deaths
Sportspeople from Zagreb
Physicians from Zagreb
People from the Kingdom of Croatia-Slavonia
Yugoslav football managers
Yugoslavia national football team managers
Yugoslav physicians